This is a list of broadcast television stations that are licensed in the U.S. state of South Carolina.

Full-power stations
VC refers to the station's PSIP virtual channel. RF refers to the station's physical RF channel.

Defunct full-power stations
Channel 23: WGVL – Greenville (7/15/1953-4/29/1956)
Channel 25: WCOS-TV – Columbia (5/1/1953-1/21/1956)

LPTV stations

Translators

See also
 South Carolina media
 List of newspapers in South Carolina
 List of radio stations in South Carolina
 Media of locales in South Carolina: Charleston, Columbia, Greenville

Bibliography

External links
 
 
  (Directory ceased in 2017)
 South Carolina Broadcasters Association

South Carolina

Television Stations